is a Japanese economist. He is a professor at Kobe University.

Career
Kamiya earned his B.A. from Kyoto University in 1981, his M.A. from Osaka University in 1983, and his Ph.D. from Yale University in 1986.  He received the Nakahara Prize in 2000.

Selected publications

References

External links
 Faculty profile at Kobe University

1957 births
Living people
People from Hamamatsu
20th-century Japanese economists
21st-century Japanese  economists
General equilibrium theorists
Kyoto University alumni
Osaka University alumni
Yale University alumni
Academic staff of Osaka University
Academic staff of the University of Tokyo
Academic staff of Kobe University